Building the nation and other poems, published by Fountain Publishers in 2000, is a collection of 76 poems by Ugandan poet Christopher Henry Muwanga Barlow. The poems are divided into seven sections: "Politicians, servants and sycophants", "The jungles of humanity", "Arguments with God", "Random portraits", "Of nature", "The rich live amalgam", and "Of love and all that". The poems deal with diverse themes like political opportunism and sycophancy, war, the paradox of God and  the richness and beauty of nature.

Critical reception
The poems have received mainly positive reviews.

References

External links 
"One man’s reading list"

Poetry collections
Ugandan poetry books
2000 poetry books
Kumusha